The 1937–38 season was the 40th in the history of the Southern League. Guildford City won the title. Ipswich Town were again the only Southern League club to apply for election to the Football League, and this time were successful.

Final table

A total of 18 teams contest the division, including 15 sides from previous season and three new teams.

Newly elected teams:
 Colchester United from Eastern Counties League
 Bristol Rovers II
 Swindon Town II

Football League election
Ipswich Town were the only non-League club to apply for election to the Football League Third Division South. Having been unsuccessful the previous season, this time they won more votes than both Football League clubs, the first time a non-League club had topped an admission ballot since 1920.

References

1937-38
4
1937–38 in Welsh football